Nuala McAllister is a Northern Irish politician who is an Alliance Party Member of the Legislative Assembly (MLA). She was elected as an MLA in the 2022 Northern Ireland Assembly election for Belfast North.

Political career

Councillor (2014–2022) 
McAllister was elected as an Alliance Party councillor for the Castle DEA in North Belfast on Belfast City Council at the 2014 local elections, taking 9.64% of the first preference votes. She was re-elected at the 2019 local elections, topping the poll with 1,787 first preference votes and being elected at the first count - narrowly edging out future Sinn Féin MP John Finucane, who was also elected on the first count.

Lord Mayor of Belfast and rising profile (2017–2022) 
She was the Lord Mayor of Belfast in 2017–2018. She announced the theme of her Mayorship as 'Global Belfast'. She described her aim as promoting "Belfast as an open, inclusive and welcoming place to live and do business". McAllister garnered controversy for being outspoken in support of liberalising Northern Ireland's abortion laws, as well as due to her campaigning for marriage equality during her term as Lord Mayor. Due to her outspoken beliefs, Belfast City Council member Jim Rodgers called McAllister "one of the worst lord mayors we have ever had" for "failing to remain impartial". Alliance responded to criticism of McAllister by saying that she was "a breath of fresh air in the role and an excellent role model for young women and working mums everywhere".

She also ran in both the 2016 and 2017 Northern Ireland Assembly elections as the Alliance candidate for Belfast North, where she was the runner up both times - 7th (when the constituency had 6 seats) and 6th (when the constituency moved to 5 seats) - missing out on a seat by 1,012 and then just 556 votes.

Prior to her election in 2022, she also unsuccessfully stood for election in the Belfast North Westminster constituency at the 2019 UK general election. She came in a distant third place with 4,824 votes, equating to 9.8% of the total vote. However, this was an increase of 4.4% compared to the previous Alliance candidate in 2017 (her partner - Sam Nelson).

Member of the Legislative Assembly (2022–) 
Nuala McAllister was Alliance's candidate for the 2022 Assembly election in Belfast North. She polled 4,381 first preference votes and was elected on the 11th count. She gained the seat held by SDLP Deputy Leader and Infrastructure Minister, Nichola Mallon, by a margin of 991 votes, in one of 9 gains for Alliance in the election.

Personal life 
McAllister has two sons with her partner, Sam Nelson, and was the first "young mother" to be Lord Mayor. The couple's decision not to marry was influenced by their shared atheist beliefs.

References

External links 

Living people
Alliance Party of Northern Ireland MLAs
Northern Ireland MLAs 2022–2027
Year of birth missing (living people)
21st-century women politicians from Northern Ireland
Female members of the Northern Ireland Assembly
Women councillors in Northern Ireland
Politicians from Belfast
Alliance Party parliamentary candidates